Požarje is a settlement in the hills above the left bank of the Sava River, southeast of Šentlambert in the Municipality of Zagorje ob Savi in central Slovenia. The area is part of the traditional region of Upper Carniola. It is now included with the rest of the municipality in the Central Sava Statistical Region.

References

External links
Požarje on Geopedia

Populated places in the Municipality of Zagorje ob Savi